Bulbostylis bathiei is a species of plant in the family Cyperaceae first described by Henri Chermezon. No subspecies listed in the Catalogue of Life.

References

bathiei
Taxa named by Henri Chermezon